The Catholic Archdiocese of Belgrade is an archdiocese located in the city of Belgrade in Serbia.

History
In order to regulate status of local Catholic Church, the government of the Kingdom of Serbia concluded official Concordat with Holy See on 24 June 1914. By the Second Article of Concordat, it was decided that regular Catholic Archdiocese of Belgrade shall be created. Because of the breakout of the First World War, those provisions could not be implemented, and only after 1918 were new arrangements made:

 October 29, 1924: Promoted as Archdiocese of Belgrade
 December 16, 1986: Promoted as Metropolitan Archdiocese of Belgrade

United Titles
 Smederevo (Since December 23, 1729)

Leadership
 Bishops of Beograd
 Bishop Jozef Ignác de Vilt (22 December 1800 – 26 August 1806)
 Bishop Stefan Cech (26 September 1814 – 8 January 1821)
 Bishop Venceslao Soic (23 December 1858 – 8 January 1869)
 Bishop Giovanni Paolesic (4 July 1871 – 1893)
 Archbishops of Beograd
 Archbishop Ivan Rafael Rodić, O.F.M. (29 October 1924 – 28 November 1936)
 Archbishop Josip Antun Ujčić (28 November 1936 – 24 March 1964)
 Archbishop Gabrijel Bukatko (24 March 1964 – 4 March 1980)
 Archbishop Alojz Turk (4 March 1980 – 16 December 1986)
 Archbishop Franc Perko (16 December 1986 – 31 March 2001)
 Archbishop Stanislav Hočevar, S.D.B. (31 March 2001 – 5 November 2022)
 Archbishop László Német, S.V.D. (5 November 2022 - present)

Suffragan dioceses
 Diocese of Subotica
 Diocese of Zrenjanin

Titular dioceses on the territory of Archdiocese
 Naissus (see), titular see.

See also
Catholicism in Serbia
Cathedral of the Blessed Virgin Mary, Belgrade
Co-cathedral of Christ the King, Belgrade
List of Catholic dioceses in Serbia

References

Sources
 
 Diocese website
 GCatholic.org
 Catholic Hierarchy
 Diocese website

Roman Catholic dioceses in Serbia
Dioceses established in the 9th century
Christianity in Belgrade